Welscheid is a village in the commune of Bourscheid, in north-eastern Luxembourg.

Welscheid is connected to the cycling path PC16 with a short serpentine road to Bourscheid.

References

Bourscheid, Luxembourg
Villages in Luxembourg